Hexisopodidae is a family of solifuges, first described by Reginald Innes Pocock in 1897.

Genera 
, the World Solifugae Catalog accepts the following two genera:

 Chelypus Purcell, 1902
 Hexisopus Karsch, 1879

References 

Arachnids of Africa
Solifugae